Hezbollah is a Shi'a Islamist political party and militia in Lebanon.

Hezbollah may also refer to:

Afghanistan
 Hizbullah Afghan, Afghan Taliban politician and military officer
Hezbollah Afghanistan, a former rebel group and later political party in Afghanistan
Liwa Fatemiyoun, alternatively called "Hezbollah Afghanistan" and closely connected to the party of that name
Liwa Zainebiyoun, a splinter group of Liwa Fatemiyoun fighting in Syria with Syrian pro-government forces

Azerbaijan
Islamic Resistance Movement of Azerbaijan, nicknamed "Azerbaijani Hezbollah"

Iran
 Kurdish Hezbollah of Iran, a Kurdish Islamist party 
 Hezbollah Organization, a militant organization in Iran that aimed to overthrow the Pahlavi dynasty
 Hezbollah (Iran), a general name used to refer to pro-establishment forces in the Islamic Republic of Iran
 Ansar-e Hezbollah, a quasi-clandestine organization of a paramilitary character that performs vigilante duties
 Hezbollah fraction, a parliamentary group active between 1996 and 2000
 Hezbollah Assembly, a parliamentary group active between 1996 and 2000
 Independent Hezbollah deputies, a parliamentary group active between 1996 and 2000

Iraq
 Hezbollah Movement in Iraq, a Shi'a Islamist political party in Iraq aligned with the Supreme Islamic Council of Iraq
 Harakat Hezbollah al-Nujaba, a Shi'a Islamist paramilitary group in Iraq
 Kata'ib Hezbollah (also known as the Hezbollah Brigades), a Shi'a Islamist paramilitary group in Iraq
 Kurdish Revolutionary Hezbollah, an Iraqi Kurdish Islamist group that was disbanded in 2004

Mauritius 
 Mauritian Solidarity Front, a political party in Mauritius that was formerly known until 2004 as Hizbullah (Party of God)

Saudi Arabia
 Hezbollah Al-Hejaz, a Shi'a militant organization operating in Saudi Arabia, Lebanon, Kuwait and Bahrain

Turkey
 Kurdish Hezbollah, a Kurdish Sunni Islamist group, known in Turkey as "Hizbullah"

See also
"Hizbollah", track on Ministry's 1988 album The Land of Rape and Honey
Hezbollah International Financing Prevention Act of 2014, a US bill putting sanctions on financiers and institutions related to Hezbollah in Lebanon